HL156A is a derivative of metformin and a potent OXPHOS inhibitor and AMPK activating biguanide. Certain types of cancer cells requires OXPHOS to survive. By targeting it, HL156A might help in improving anticancer therapy. It is more potent than AICAR or metformin at activating AMPK. It is synthesized by Hanall Biopharma.

Medical uses 
It is in phase 1 trial in patients with advanced solid tumor and lymphoma.

Pharmacology 

Apart from AMPK activation, it also inhibits expression and activation of IGF-1, AKT, mTOR, and ERK.

Research 
It is researched in multiple conditions like liver and renal fibrosis, cancer and drug resistance in cancer. A drug HL176OUT04 with similar pharmacology has been also developed.

See also 
 Phenformin

References 

Pyrrolidines
Guanidines
Trifluoromethyl ethers
Phenols